North Barito Regency is one of the thirteen regencies which divide the Central Kalimantan Province on the island of Kalimantan, Indonesia. Muara Teweh (in Teweh Tengah District) is the capital of North Barito Regency, which covers an area of 8,300 km2. The population of North Barito Regency  was 121,573 at the 2010 Census and 154,812 at the 2020 Census; the official estimate as at mid 2021 was 157,231.

Administrative Districts 
At the 2010 Census, North Barito Regency consisted of six districts (kecamatan), but three additional districts were subsequently created by the splitting of existing districts. All nine are tabulated below with their areas and population totals from the 2010 Census and the 2020 Census; together with the official estimates as at mid 2021. The table also includes the locations of the district administrative centres, the number of administrative villages (rural desa and urban kelurahan) in each district, and its postal codes.

Note: (a) except the village of Melayu (with a post code of 73811) and the village of Lanjas (with a post code of 73812). (b) the 2010 populations of the new Teweh Baru and Teweh Selatan Districts are included in the figure for Teweh Tengah District, from which they were split off (Teweh Baru District also acquired three villages from Teweh Timur District). (c) except the village of Jambu (with a post code of 73813) and the villages of Gandring, Liangbuah and Panaen (with a post code of 73881). (d) the 2010 population of the new Lahei Barat District is included in the figure for Lahai District, from which it was split off.

Demographics
Religion as of the Indonesia 2010 census:
Muslim  71.3%
Protestant  11.6%
Roman Catholic  5.0%
Hindu  0.1%
Buddhist  0.0%
Confucian  0.0%
Other  11.8%
Not stated or not asked  0.2%

Airports
A new airport was built by Muara Teweh for a predicted initial operation in 2013. The airport covers 180 hectares area and will has 2,250 metres length and 30 metres width of runway to accommodate wide body aircraft.
The new airport was built to replace Beringin Airport which cannot be expanded.
Haji Muhammad Sidik Airport  is an airport located at Trinsing, South Teweh, North Barito Regency. The airport was inaugurated by Vice President Ma'ruf Amin and Minister of Transportation Budi Karya Sumadi on 30 March 2021.

References

Regencies of Central Kalimantan